Connerville is a rural unincorporated community and census-designated place on the Blue River in Johnston County, Oklahoma, United States. The post office opened August 6, 1897, in District 16 of the old Indian Territory. The ZIP Code is 74836. It is said to have been named for George B. Conner, the first postmaster.

The Census Bureau defined a census-designated place (CDP) for Connerville in 2015; the 2010 population within the 2015 CDP boundary is 80 and contains 42 housing units.

Demographics

In popular culture
The X-Files episode "D.P.O." (season three, episode three), in which a young man survives lightning strikes as well as emanates electrical discharges, was set in Connerville.

References

Sources
Shirk, George H. Oklahoma Place Names. Norman: University of Oklahoma Press, 1987.  .

Unincorporated communities in Johnston County, Oklahoma
Unincorporated communities in Oklahoma
Census-designated places in Johnston County, Oklahoma
Census-designated places in Oklahoma